Ruby, in comics, may refer to:

 Ruby, a character in Dark Horse Comics' Catalyst: Agents of Change
 Ruby Thursday, a Marvel Comics supervillain

See also
Ruby (disambiguation)